Shen Yueyue (born January 1957) is a Chinese politician, former regional official, and is the current President of the All-China Women's Federation, and a Vice-Chairwoman of the National People's Congress Standing Committee. In her early career she served in Zhejiang province, before going to Anhui province and later the Organization Department of the Chinese Communist Party.

Biography 

Born in Ningbo, Zhejiang Province, She started working in April 1977 as a clerk at a local food store. From June 1978 to July 1980, she studied at Ningbo Normal College, majoring in mathematics. She joined the Chinese Communist Party in September, 1981. After that, she became a teacher at Ningbo 7th High School, and deputy secretary of Communist Youth League committee of the school. In August, 1983, Shen was elevated to vice secretary of CYL Ningbo committee and became the secretary a year later. In November 1986, Shen became the vice secretary of CYL Zhejiang committee, and was promoted to secretary in November 1991. 

In March 1993, she was appointed as Deputy Party Secretary Hangzhou, the provincial capital. In February 1997, she became the secretary of CCP Shaoxing committee. In December 1998, Shen was elevated to the Zhejiang Provincial Party Standing Committee (sub-provincial rank), and vice director of organization department of Zhejiang. She became the director of organization department in January, 1999. From June, 2001 to November, 2002, Shen served as vice secretary of CCP Anhui committee. From November 2002, she has served as vice director of Central Organization Department of CCP. She was also the vice Minister of Personnel from April, 2003 till the abolishment of the Ministry in 2007. Between July 2007 and April 2013, Shen served as the Executive Deputy Head of the Organization Department of Chinese Communist Party. In March 2013, she was named Vice-Chairman of the National People's Congress, joining the ranks of "party and state leaders". In May 2013 she became the President of the All-China Women's Federation.

On 7 December 2020, pursuant to Executive Order 13936, the US Department of the Treasury imposed sanctions on all 14 Vice Chairperson of the National People's Congress, including Shen, for "undermining Hong Kong's autonomy and restricting the freedom of expression or assembly."

Shen was an alternate member of 15th and 16th Central Committees of the Chinese Communist Party, and was a full member of 17th, 18th,  19th, and 20th Central Committees.

References 

1957 births
Living people
20th-century Chinese women politicians
21st-century Chinese women politicians
21st-century Chinese politicians
All-China Women's Federation people
Alternate members of the 15th Central Committee of the Chinese Communist Party
Alternate members of the 16th Central Committee of the Chinese Communist Party
Central Party School of the Chinese Communist Party alumni
Chairperson and vice chairpersons of the Standing Committee of the 12th National People's Congress
Chairperson and vice chairpersons of the Standing Committee of the 13th National People's Congress
Chinese Communist Party politicians from Zhejiang
Chinese individuals subject to U.S. Department of the Treasury sanctions
Individuals sanctioned by the United States under the Hong Kong Autonomy Act
Members of the 17th Central Committee of the Chinese Communist Party
Members of the 18th Central Committee of the Chinese Communist Party
Members of the 19th Central Committee of the Chinese Communist Party
Members of the 20th Central Committee of the Chinese Communist Party
Ningbo University alumni
People's Republic of China politicians from Zhejiang
Politicians from Ningbo
Political office-holders in Zhejiang